Mattie Montgomery is an American musician and the former lead vocalist and frontman of Christian metal band For Today from 2007. He released six albums and one EP with the band before they broke up in 2016. In addition to his work with For Today, Montgomery has his own solo gospel project named after himself in which he has released three albums and two books. He now pastors a church, The Altar Fellowship, in Johnson City, Tennessee.

Music career 

Montgomery began his involvement in music at the age of fifteen, where he has stated he listened to bands such as Senses Fail and A Static Lullaby. Groups such as these opened the door to heavier bands that would inspire Montgomery to try heavy vocals and screams in his singing. Before joining For Today, Montgomery was the lead vocalist for the melodic metal band Besieged.

Montgomery replaced For Today's original lead vocalist, Matt Tyler, in 2007. In an interview, Montgomery has said that he did not know a single member of the band before his joining. After only a few practices with the band, Montgomery began touring with them. He had given the members of For Today two conditions for his joining of the band: First, the band must have a Bible study together every day. Second, Montgomery wanted the band to use their time on stage performing to minister to the audience. Since he joined For Today, Montgomery has played well over 700 shows and toured extensively in six continents with the group. On July 5, 2016, the band announced that they would be disbanding after a farewell tour.

Christianity 
Montgomery is an outspoken Christian. He is passionate about Jesus and has made this evident with lyrics of For Today. Montgomery also works as an evangelist.

Bands 
The Altar Music
Welcome Home (2022) - songwriter / spoken word 
 For Today - vocals (2007–2016)
 Mattie Montgomery - spoken word (solo)
 Besieged - vocals (2007)
 Earth vs The Spider - vocals
 This My Soul - vocals
 Bedside Redemption - vocals

The Altar Music
Welcome Home (2022) - songwriter / spoken word

Discography 
With Besieged
 Atlantis (Blood and Ink Records, 2007)
With For Today
 Ekklesia (Facedown Records, 2008)
 Portraits (Facedown Records, 2009)
 Breaker (Facedown Records, 2010) U.S. No. 54
 Immortal (Razor & Tie Records, 2012) U.S. No. 15
 Prevailer EP (Razor & Tie Records, 2013)
 Fight the Silence (Razor & Tie Records, 2014)
 Wake (Nuclear Blast Records, 2015)
Solo
 When the Sons Become Fathers (Come&Live!, 2010)
 The Keys to Open Ancient Gates (Catapult, 2011)
 See the Storm

Collaborations

Videography 
"Agape"
"Saul of Tarsus (The Messenger)" (directed by Drew Russ)
"Devastator" (Scott Hansen Productions)
"Seraphim" (directed by Drew Russ)
"Fearless"
"Foundation"
"Flesh and Blood" (directed by Ramon Boutviseth)
"Fight the Silence"
"Break the Cycle"
"Molotov"
"Broken Lens"
"Bitter Roots"

Solo work
Montgomery has released three spoken-word gospel albums under his own name. His First album, When the Sons Become Fathers, was released on March 1, 2010, under the Come And Live! record label. His second solo album, The Keys to Open Ancient Gates, was released on June 14, 2011, under Catapult records. On October 1, 2013 he released the third album, See the Storm.

Montgomery has also released two books: Lovely Things in Ugly Places (2015) and Scary God (2018).

Personal life

Montgomery currently lives in Johnson City, Tennessee with his wife, and their three sons.

References

Living people
American performers of Christian music
Christian metal musicians
Singers from Iowa
Writers from Sioux City, Iowa
1987 births
21st-century American singers
21st-century American male singers